Gabriel Hernández Alonso (born 1944) is a Colombian footballer. He competed in the men's tournament at the 1968 Summer Olympics.

References

External links
 

1944 births
Living people
Colombian footballers
Colombia international footballers
Olympic footballers of Colombia
Footballers at the 1968 Summer Olympics
People from Cundinamarca Department
Association football defenders
Millonarios F.C. players